Rho Piscium (ρ Piscium) is a solitary, yellow-hued star in the zodiac constellation of Pisces. With an apparent visual magnitude of +5.34, it is faintly visible to the naked eye. Based upon an annual parallax shift of 39.66 mas as seen from Earth, it is located 82 light years from the Sun. It is a member of the thin disk population of the Milky Way.

This is an F-type main sequence star with a stellar classification of F2 V. It is a suspected variable star that ranges in magnitude from a maximum of 5.35 to a minimum of 5.44 magnitude. It is 778 million years old and is spinning with a projected rotational velocity of 60.1 km/s. The star has 1.3 times the mass of the Sun and about 1.1 times the Sun's radius. It is radiating 3.6 times the Sun's luminosity from its photosphere at an effective temperature of 6,822 K.

Naming

References

F-type main-sequence stars
Suspected variables
Piscium, Rho
Pisces (constellation)
Durchmusterung objects
Piscium, 093
008723
006706
0413